Pain Research & Management is a peer-reviewed medical journal. It covers all aspects of research on pain management. The journal is published by the Hindawi Publishing Corporation.

In 2014, the journal moved to open access.

References

External links 
 

Publications established in 1996
Anesthesiology and palliative medicine journals
Hindawi Publishing Corporation academic journals
Multilingual journals
Bimonthly journals